The Cello Concerto No. 1 ("Grande Concerto No. 1"), Op. 50, was composed by Heitor Villa-Lobos in 1915 according to the manuscript, though the printed score of the piano reduction gives 1913. It is the composer's first large-scale work, and shows the unmistakable influence of Tchaikovsky.

The first performance was at the Teatro Municipal (Rio de Janeiro), May 10, 1919 with soloist Newton Pádua and the composer conducting. A performance lasts about twenty minutes.

Structure
The concerto calls for an orchestra consisting of piccolo, two flutes, two oboes, two clarinets, two bassoons, four horns, three trumpets, three trombones, tuba, timpani, harp and strings. It is in three movements:

References

Works cited

External links
Cello Concerto #1.
Cello Concerto #1.

Villa-Lobos, Heitor No. 1
Compositions by Heitor Villa-Lobos